was a Japanese zoologist. He published over 200 scientific articles on marine animals such as chaetognaths, ctenophores, and tunicates. He was Professor of Zoology at Kyoto University working at the Seto Marine Biological Laboratory in Shirahama, Japan. From 1975 to 1977, he was the Director of SMBL.

Eponymous species 
At least a dozen species are named in his honor, including these below.

Acartia tokiokai Mori, 1942 - Copepoda
Atlanta tokiokai van der Spoel & Troost, 1972 - Heteropoda
Bolivina tokiokai Uchio, 1962 - Formanifera
Eudistoma tokiokai Nishikawa, 1990 - Ascidiacea
Euchromadora tokiokai Wieser, 1955 - Nematoda
Krohnittella tokiokai Bieri, 1974 - Chaetognatha
Ophiocentrus tokiokai Irimura, 1981 - Ophiuroidea
Polycarpa tokiokai Monniot & Monniot, 1996 - Ascidiacea
Styela tokiokai Nishikawa, 1991 - Ascidiacea

References

1913 births
2001 deaths
Japanese marine biologists
20th-century Japanese zoologists
Academic staff of Kyoto University
Marine zoologists